"In Another Love" is a song by Australian rock band Mondo Rock, released in March 1983 as the third and final single from the band's third studio album Nuovo Mondo (1982). It peaked at number 86 on the Kent Music Report.

Track listing 
 "In Another Love" - 3:57
 "Is It Any Wonder?"

Charts

References

Mondo Rock songs
1983 singles
1982 songs
Warner Music Group singles